, is a Japanese manga series written and illustrated by Motoka Murakami. It was serialized in Shogakukan's Weekly Shōnen Sunday from June 1975 to September 1977.

Plot
Ken Akaba is a top-rank stock-car driver who was involved in a horrific accident, which killed 6 spectators. He was badly hurt, but he survived and promised his younger sister that he would give up racing. He goes to America to help his father develop a new Formula 1 racer, but in the testing of the car runs at speeds that set records—so the pressure is on for him to return to racing, this time in the F-1 circuit. He has supporters, but there are also those who do not want him to come back, including those who caused the original crash.

Manga
Akai Pegasus is written and illustrated by Motoka Murakami. It was serialized in Shogakukan's shōnen manga magazine Weekly Shōnen Sunday from June 22, 1977 to September 5, 1979. The series was collected into fourteen tankōbon volumes published by Shogakukan from October 24, 1977 to January 24, 1980.

Volume list

|}

References

External links 
 

Shogakukan manga
Shōnen manga